France–Spain relations are bilateral relations between France and Spain, in which both share a long border across the Pyrenees, other than one point which is cut off by Andorra. As two of the most powerful kingdoms of the early modern era, France and Spain fought a 24-year war (the Franco-Spanish War) until the signing of the Treaty of the Pyrenees in 1659. The treaty was signed on the Pheasant Island between the two nations, which has since been a condominium, changing its allegiances each six months.

Both nations are member states of the European Union (and both nations utilize the euro as currency) and are both members of the Council of Europe, OECD, NATO, Union for the Mediterranean, and the United Nations.

History

Medieval 
The entire mainlands of both Gaul and Hispania were possessions of the Roman Empire.

While the term "Spain" may be improper when used to refer to France–Spain relations before the union of the Crown of Castile and the Crown of Aragon in 1476, there has always been important relations between what are now France and Spain.

One important feature of those early relations was that counts from the Marca Hispanica and Navarre fought shoulder to shoulder with Frankish Kings (during the Carolingian dynasty), to protect Europe from the Al Andalus Muslim kingdom. Barcelona was a County of the Frankish Empire, under protection of the Franc Imperator.

This vassality of Marca Hispanica and Navarre to the Frankish empire remained effective up to 985. At that point, because his armies were mobilized in the Verdum's county, Lothair of France and his Byzantine allies did not assist Navarre and Marca Hispanica in its defense against the Caliph, implying that they failed to defend Barcelona from the Arabs. Almanzor did not stay in the cities (the first assault was launched 6 July 985; withdrew their troops 23 July), but this incursion was arguably the first step of a process of independence of the county of Barcelona from the kingdom of France, and heralded what would become the Aragon kingdom. While independent of France and integrated in the Crown of Aragon, Barcelona remained legally a county of France and the King of France retained a  de jure right to vote in the Barcelone Courts in the next centuries. This situation generated numerous territorial conflicts between the two kingdoms to control what is now the south of France and the north of Spain (the support of Aragon to the Count of Toulouse, death in Perpignan of Philip III of France married to Isabel of Aragon, and Albigenses Crusades are some of the most famous examples) and played a significant political role in the start of the Catalan Revolt which ended with the treaty of Pyrenees.

17th century

The Franco-Spanish War broke out in 1635, when French king Louis XIII felt threatened that his entire kingdom was bordered by Habsburg territories, including Spain. In 1659, the Treaty of the Pyrenees ended the war and ceded the Spanish-possessed Catalan county of Roussillon to France, which had supported the Principality of Catalonia in a revolt against the Spanish crown. Western Flanders, roughly equivalent to the modern French department of Nord, was also ceded. An anomaly of the treaty was that although all villages in Roussillon were ceded to France, Llívia was deemed to be a city and was therefore retained by Spain to the present day as an exclave  into France. The treaty was signed on Pheasant Island, an uninhabited, unserviced island in the Bidasoa river between the French commune of Hendaye and the Spanish municipality of Irun. Both settlements, and therefore their countries, took sovereignty of the island for six months out of each year. After Philip IV of Spain defeat, Marie-Thérèse of Austria, Infant of Spain, was married to the king of France Louis XIV.

18th century

In 1701, after the death of the last Habsburg king of Spain, Charles II, the French House of Bourbon, led by Louis XIV, staked a claim to the Spanish throne. The war ended with the Bourbon Philip V being recognised as King of Spain. The House of Bourbon remains on the Spanish throne to the present day. The wars were very expensive; despite Mexican silver Spain declines economically.

19th century

Revolutionary France and Bourbon Spain signed the Treaty of San Ildefonso in 1796 as part of their shared opposition to Britain. The relationship spoiled after defeat in 1805 at the Battle of Trafalgar, and in 1808, French Emperor Napoleon invaded Spain and named his brother Joseph as King of Spain as part of a plan to get closer to invading Britain's ally, Portugal. The British under the Duke of Wellington drove the French out of Spain in 1813 following the Battle of Vitoria.

The Bourbon king Ferdinand VII was imprisoned by Napoleon, but still remained recognized as Spanish monarch by Napoleon's adversaries. He returned to the throne in 1813 after the defeat of the French in the Peninsular War.

In 1820, a military uprising in Spain lead to a liberal government, the Trienio Liberal, to come to power. Two years later, Ferdinand VII lobbied the monarchs of Europe to help him restore his power, to which France responded by sending 60,000 troops which overthrew the liberal government and re-installed Ferdinand as the absolute monarch.

20th century

Aftermath of the Spanish Civil War and the outbreak of World War II, 1939–1945 

When the Nationalist forces of General Francisco Franco were victorious at the end of the Spanish Civil War in 1939, there was discussion of Llívia, a small exclaved Spanish city  into France, becoming territory of the defeated Republican Army. No conclusion was reached and the French authorities allowed the Nationalists to occupy Llívia.

France had tentatively supported the Spanish Republicans during the civil war, and had to readjust its foreign policy towards Spain in the fact of the Nationalists' imminent victory. On 25 February 1939, France and Francoist Spain signed the Bérard-Jordana Agreement, in which France recognized the Franco government as the legitimate government of Spain and agreed to return Spanish property of various types (including, among others. weapons and munitions, gold reserves, art and livestock) previously in the possession of the Republicans to the Nationalists. In return, the new Spanish government agreed to good neighborly relations, colonial cooperation in Morocco, and made informal assurances to repatriate the more than 400,000 refugees that had fled from the Nationalists' Catalonia Offensive into France in early 1939. Philippe Pétain, later the leader of the Vichy regime during the German occupation of France, became the French ambassador to the new Spanish government. Spain would later undermine the spirit of the Bérard-Jordana Agreement when the Spanish entry into the Anti-Comintern Pact and subsequent alignment with the German and Italian fascists resulted in a military buildup in colonial Morocco, in spite of the promise of cooperative policy in that area. Spain was however unwilling to be drawn into World War II, and had announced its intentions to remain neutral in German expansionist designs to France as early as the 1938 Sudeten crisis. This scepticism towards Spanish involvement on German behalf was further strengthened when the Spanish government got news of German cooperation with the Soviet Union, formerly a supporter of the Spanish Republicans during the civil war, under the 1939 Molotov–Ribbentrop Pact. Although Spain remained neutral, Spanish volunteers were allowed to fight on the side of the Axis powers as part of the German "Blue" 250th Infantry Division.

With the restoration of the French government in the latter part of the Second World War, relations between Spain and France became more complex.  Exiled Spanish Communists had infiltrated northern Spain from France via the Val d'Aran but were repelled by Franco's army and police forces. The border between the two countries was temporarily closed by the French in June 1945.

Between World War and Cold War, 1945–1949 
The border between France and Spain was closed indefinitely on 1 March 1946, following the execution of the Communist guerrilla Cristino García in Spain. The Franco government criticized the action, commenting that many refugees from France had used the same border to escape to safety in Spain during the war. Several days after the border closing, France issued a diplomatic note with the United States and Britain calling for the formation of a new provisional government in Madrid. Additionally, Spain's formerly close relationship with Italy and Nazi Germany led to suspicion and accusations. Some Nazis and French collaborators fled to Francoist Spain following the end of the war, most notably Pierre Laval, who was turned over to the Allies in July 1945. One French report claimed that 100,000 Nazis and collaborators were sheltered in Spain. The Soviet Union declared there were 200,000 Nazis in the country and that Franco was manufacturing nuclear weapons and intended to invade France in 1946.

The Franco regime during the Cold War, 1949–1975 
With the advent of the Cold War, relations gradually improved. The Pyrenean border was re-opened again in February 1948.  Several months later France (along with Britain) signed a commercial agreement with the Franco government. Relations further improved in 1950 when the French government, concerned about international subversion, forced the Spanish Communist Party to leave France.

Franco-Spanish relations would become more tense with the rise to power of Charles de Gaulle, especially when the rebel French general Raoul Salan found sanctuary among Falangists in Spain for six months in 1960–61. Nevertheless, some commercial relations were done, the French finance minister visited Madrid in April 1963 to conclude a new commercial treaty. Nevertheless, it is undoubted that the aggressive rhetoric that both Franco and de Gaulle used against each other did not improve the relationship between the countries.

Post-Francoist Spain, 1975–2000 
When Spain was led by general Francisco Franco, the French believed that ETA attacks were aimed at overthrowing the government of Franco, and did not feel targeted by ETA. The reason for this was the help that regime of Franco gave to the terrorist organization OAS and because of that when ETA started to kill people de Gaulle gave them shelter in the French Basque Country, the so-called Le Sanctuaire. However, when the attacks continued after the death of Franco, France started a collaboration with the Spanish government against ETA.

In recent years, due to an improving economy in Spain, the balance between France and Spain has shifted somewhat. The balance has also changed because of the democratization of Spain since the death of Franco in 1975. France, Spain, and the United Kingdom were the main European Union (EU) member countries that classified the ETA organization as a terrorist group. In addition, this group was also associated with the IRA terrorist group.

21st century

Currently, France is one of the largest trading partners of Spain. In March 2015, Philip VI of Spain chose to go to France as its first diplomatic visit since his accession. The visit was widely regarded as a way to hail the excellent bilateral relations between France and Spain.

Since May 2022, both countries finalize their first Friendship Treaty. In this way, Spain would be the third country with which France reaches such a status in its diplomatic relations, after Germany (1963) and Italy (2021). As a consequence of the Russian invasion of Ukraine, new proposals for the transport of gas through Europe were reconsidered. In this sense, France, Portugal, and Spain would discuss the distribution of costs and the deadlines for new energy projects, which would bring gas and hydrogen from the Iberian Peninsula to the rest of the continent.

On 19 January 2023, Spanish Prime Minister Pedro Sánchez and French President Emmanuel Macron signed a Treaty of Friendship between both countries.

Cultural exchange

During the Roaring' 20s, France was the scene of major art exhibitions attended by famous Spanish artists, such as Joan Miró, Joaquín Sorolla, Pablo Picasso or Salvador Dalí. 

The Spanish Civil War and hardship immediately after spurred Spanish migration to the more developed and democratic France, which had a labour shortage in the aftermath of the Second World War. The Spanish artist Pablo Picasso, resident in the French capital Paris since 1901, was refused naturalisation shortly after Franco took control of Spain, but remained in Paris until his death in 1973.

A Eurostat publication in 2016, estimated that 122,385 French citizens live in Spain and 128,000 Spanish citizens live in France, while it is also estimated that 144,039 people in France were born in Spain. Currently, it is estimated that there are more than 125,000 French residents in Spain and more than 275,000 Spanish residents in France. Furthermore, after English, French is the second most studied foreign language in Spain, while Spanish is the second most studied foreign language in France.

With a dual nationality agreement, French and Spaniards can acquire nationality without giving up their nationality. France is the first country outside the Ibero-American sphere with which Spain signed an agreement of this nature, strengthening the friendship between both countries.

Resident diplomatic missions

of France in Spain
 Madrid (Embassy)
 Barcelona (Consulate-General)
 Bilbao (Consulate-General)
 Seville (Consulate-General)

of Spain in France

 Paris (Embassy)
 Bayonne (Consulate-General)
 Bordeaux (Consulate-General)
 Lyon (Consulate-General)
 Montpellier (Consulate-General)
 Marseille (Consulate-General)
 Pau (Consulate-General)
 Perpignan (Consulate-General)
 Strasbourg (Consulate-General)
 Toulouse (Consulate-General)

Summits 

 23rd French–Spanish Summit; 27 November 2013 in Madrid.
 24th French–Spanish Summit; 1 December 2014 in Paris.
 25th French–Spanish Summit; 20 February 2017 in Málaga.
 26th French–Spanish Summit; 15 March 2021 in Montauban: Spain and France signed an agreement on dual citizenship.

Country comparison

See also
 Foreign relations of France
 Foreign relations of Spain
 France–Spain border

References

Further reading
 Bertrand, Louis and Charles Petrie. The History of Spain (2nd ed. 1956) online
 Carr, Raymond. Spain, 1808–1975 (2nd ed 1982), a standard scholarly survey
 Cortada, James W. Spain in the Twentieth-Century World: Essays on Spanish Diplomacy, 1898-1978 (1980)
 Cortada, James W. A Bibliographic Guide to Spanish Diplomatic History, 1460-1977 (Greenwood Press, 1977) 390 pages
 Esdaile, Charles. Peninsular Eyewitnesses: The Experience of War in Spain and Portugal 1808-1813 (Pen and Sword, 2008).
 Fernández-de-Pinedo, Nadia, and Corinne Thépaut-Cabasset. "A Taste for French Style in Bourbon Spain: Food, Drink and Clothing in 1740s Madrid." in A Taste for Luxury in Early Modern Europe, Londres, à paraître (2017) online. 
 Folmer, Henry D. Franco-Spanish Rivalry in North America, 1524-1763 (1953)
 Gallagher, Matthew D. "Leon Blum and the Spanish Civil War." Journal of Contemporary History 6.3 (1971): 56-64.

 Hill, David Jayne. A history of diplomacy in the international development of Europe (3 vol. 1914)  online v 3, 1648–1775.
 Ilie, Paul. "Toward a concept of literary relations: Spain and France in the 18th century." Neohelicon 12.2 (1985): 149-170.

 Israel, Jonathan. "A Revolutionary Era: Napoleon, Spain, and the Americas (1808–15)." in The Expanding Blaze (Princeton University Press, 2017) pp 423-455.
 Luis, Jean-Philippe. "France and Spain: A Common Territory of Anti-Revolution (End of the 18th Century–1880)." in Cosmopolitan Conservatisms (Brill, 2021) pp. 261-282.

 Kamen, Henry. Empire: how Spain became a world power, 1492-1763 (2004).
 McKay, Derek, and Hamish M. Scott. The rise of the great powers 1648–1815 (1983).
 Merriman, John. A History of Modern Europe: From the Renaissance to the Present (3rd ed. 2009, 2 vol), 1412 pp; university textbook
 Mowat, R. B. A History of European Diplomacy, 1451–1789 (1928)
 Mowat, R. B. A History of European Diplomacy 1815–1914 (1922), basic introduction
 Payne, Stanley G. A History of Spain and Portugal (2 vol 1973) full text online vol 1 before 1700; full text online vol 2 after 1700; a standard scholarly history
 Petrie, Charles. Earlier Diplomatic History, 1492–1713 (1949) online
 Price, Roger. A Concise History of France (1993) excerpt and text search
 Puig, Núria, and Rafael Castro. "Patterns of international investment in Spain, 1850–2005." Business History Review 83.3 (2009): 505-537. online
 Raymond, Gino. Historical Dictionary of France (2nd ed. 2008) 528pp
 Reilly, Bernard F. "Santiago and Saint Denis: The French Presence in Eleventh-Century Spain." Catholic Historical Review 54.3 (1968): 467-483. online

 Rousselot, Nathan. "A diplomat facing the Spanish Civil War: Eirik Labonne’s embassy (October 1937-October 1938)." Relations internationales 2 (2017): 9-24. 

 Sánchez, Esther, and Rafael Castro. "Foreign Assistance to a ‘Closed Economy.’The Case of French Firms in Spain, c. 1941–1963." Enterprise & Society 14.3 (2013): 606-641. online

 Sánchez, Esther M. "French Military Action in Spain from Dictatorship to Democracy: Arms, Technology and Convergence." Journal of Contemporary History (2015): 376-399. online
 Soo, Scott. The routes to exile: France and the Spanish Civil War refugees, 1939–2009 (Manchester University Press, 2016).

 
Spain
Bilateral relations of Spain